American Journal of Men's Health, is a peer-reviewed academic journal that publishes papers in the field of Health. The journal's editor is Demetrius James Porche (Louisiana State University Health Sciences Center New Orleans - School of Nursing). It has been in publication since 2007 and is currently published by SAGE Publications.

Scope 
American Journal of Men's Health (AJMH) publishes papers from a range of health, behavioral and social disciplines including medicine, nursing and allied health. The journal provides a forum for the discussion and dissemination of the latest findings and research in the field of men's health and illness.

Abstracting and indexing 
American Journal of Men's Health is abstracted and indexed in, among other databases:  SCOPUS, and the Social Sciences Citation Index. According to the Journal Citation Reports, its 2014 impact factor is 1.234, ranking it 89 out of 145 journals in the category ‘Public, Environmental & Occupational Health’.

References

External links 
 

SAGE Publishing academic journals
English-language journals